Bis(2-Hydroxyethyl) terephthalate is an organic compound; it is the ester of ethylene glycol and terephthalic acid. Together with 2-hydroxyethyl terephthalic acid, bis(2-Hydroxyethyl) terephthalate is an intermediate in the production of poly(ethylene terephthalate).

Primary alcohols
Terephthalate esters